The Denali Destroyer Dolls (DDD) is a women's flat track roller derby league based in Wasilla, Alaska. Founded in 2010, the league consists of a single team, which competes against teams from other leagues.

The league was founded in July 2010 and played its first season in 2012/13, winning a majority of its eight bouts.  It works closely with a junior roller derby league, the Valley Vixens, and has been involved in a variety of local events, including a bra-related art exhibition.

Denali was accepted as a member of the Women's Flat Track Derby Association Apprentice Program in October 2012, and it became a full WFTDA member in September 2013. Since that time, the league never earned a ranked position within the Women's Flat Track Derby Association Rankings and is not currently a member of the WFTDA.

Skater Kandi Koated was voted onto the Alaska All-Star Team Roster list in 2013.

Skater and Trainer Athena Latina was voted onto the Alaska All-Star Team Roster list in 2013, and became the first skater to be voted as the Top Coach as well as being on the All-Star Team roster.

References

2010 establishments in Alaska
Roller derby leagues established in 2010
Roller derby leagues in Alaska
Wasilla, Alaska
Women's Flat Track Derby Association Division 3
Former Women's Flat Track Derby Association leagues